Edward J. Sullivan (1921 – July 24, 2007) was clerk of courts for Middlesex County, Massachusetts and mayor of Cambridge, Massachusetts. Edward's brother, Walter J. Sullivan also served as Mayor of Cambridge, as did his nephew, Michael. As clerk of courts, he instituted the one-day–one-case jury system.  He was succeeded as clerk of courts by his nephew, Michael A. Sullivan, after holding the position for 48 years. The former Middlesex Superior Court building was named the Edward J. Sullivan Courthouse in his honor.

External links
The City of Cambridge Assessors website: The Edward J. Sullivan "Hi-rise" courthouse (at 48 Thorndike)

References

Mayors of Cambridge, Massachusetts
1921 births
2007 deaths
Massachusetts Democrats
Massachusetts city council members
20th-century American politicians